The Aguacapa Dam (Spanish: Planta Hidroeléctrica Aguacapa ) is a reinforced concrete gravity dam and power plant spanning the Aguacapa River in Escuintla, Guatemala.

The dam's reservoir has a total capacity of 300,000 m3. The water is transported to the powerhouse through a 12.04 km long tunnel and a 3.65 km long pressure tube. The plant has  Pelton turbines, with a total installed capacity of 90 MW. The plant has a net level declination of 490.6 m, and a designed flow of 7.33 m3/s per unit.

The plant's total output between 1981 and 2006 was 6600.96 GWh, which amounts to an average annual electricity generation of 264 GWh.

See also

 List of hydroelectric power stations in Guatemala

External links

References

Hydroelectric power stations in Guatemala
Dams in Guatemala
Dams completed in 1981
Energy infrastructure completed in 1981